Eremiaphila brunneri is a species of praying mantis in the family Eremiaphilidae. They are located in and around Israel.

See also
List of mantis genera and species

References

Eremiaphila
Insects described in 1905